Bud Brown may refer to:

Bud Brown (baseball), American baseball player
Bud Brown (politician) (1927–2022), former Republican U.S. Representative from Ohio
Bud Brown (American football) (born 1961), former American football player
Ezra Brown also known as Ezra Abraham "Bud" Brown (born 1944), American mathematician

See also
Bud Browne (1912–2008), American film maker